A partial solar eclipse occurred on September 8, 1801. The eclipse was visible in Russia, and a little tip of Alaska, United States.

See also 
 List of solar eclipses in the 19th century

References

External links 
 Google interactive maps
 Solar eclipse data

1801 in science
1801 9 8
September 1801 events